Apprehension is a 1982 East German drama film  written and directed by Lothar Warneke and starring Christine Schorn.

The film was entered into the main competition at the 39th edition of the Venice Film Festival.

Plot

Cast 
 Christine Schorn as Inge Herold
 Hermann Beyer as  Dieter Schramm
 Wilfried Pucher as  Joachim
 Mike Lepke as  Mike
 Christoph Engel as  Mann in Beratungsstelle
 Sina Fiedler as  Frau in Beratungsstelle
 Cox Habbema as  Brigitte
 Jörg Hermann as  Fürsorger
 Traute Sense as  Inges Mutter

References

External links

1982 drama films
1982 films
Films directed by Lothar Warneke
East German films
German drama films
1980s German-language films
1980s German films